Steinhaus's worm snake (Afrotyphlops steinhausi) is a species of snake in the family Typhlopidae. The species is endemic to Central Africa.

Etymology
The specific name, steinhausi, is in honor of German marine biologist Carl Otto Steinhaus (1870–1919) of the Naturhistorisches Museum zu Hamburg.

Geographic range
A. steinhausi is found in Cameroon, Central African Republic, Democratic Republic of the Congo, Nigeria, and Republic of the Congo.

Reproduction
A. steinhausi is oviparous.

References

Further reading
Broadley DG, Wallach V (2009). "A review of the eastern and southern African blind-snakes (Serpentes: Typhlopidae), excluding Letheobia Cope, with the description of two new genera and a new species". Zootaxa 2255: 1–100. (Afrotyphlops steinhausi, new combination, p. 34).
Chirio, Laurent; Ineich, Ivan (2006). "Biogeography of the reptiles of the Central African Republic". African Journal of Herpetology 55 (1): 23–59. (Rhinotyphlops steinhausi, new combination).
Werner F (1909). "Über neue oder seltene Reptilien des Naturhistorischen Museums in Hamburg. I. Schlangen ". Jahrbuch der Hamburgischen Wissenschaftlichen Anstalten 26 (Supplement 2): 205–247. (Typhlops steinhausi, new species, pp. 209–210). (in German).

steinhausi
Reptiles described in 1909